The Australian High, also known as the Great Australian Bight High or Southern Australian High, is a large semi-permanent high pressure area or subtropical anticyclone that stretches from the Great Australian Bight in Western Australia and South Australia to the southern Victorian coastline on Bass Strait and the east coast of Tasmania, between 30 and 40 degrees of south latitude. 

In summer, it typically sits over southern Australia on the Bight, right below the coastline, where it generally provides dry weather in the proximate region. In winter it normally moves north, therefore permitting cold fronts and low pressure systems to relocate up from the Great Australian Bight and bring rainfall to most parts of southern Australia. Whilst it primarily occurs and remains more stationary in the warm season (Nov-Apr), it can intermittently make an appearance over the Bight in the cool season as well.

Description

The Australian High tends to follow the seasonal variation in position of the sun; it is strongest and most persistent during the southern hemisphere summer and weakest during winter when it shifts towards the interior of Australia, as the westerly frontal systems becomes more active in the region around the Bight, thereby allowing cold fronts and low-pressure systems to perforate the southern states. This high-pressure block exhibits anticyclonic behaviour, circulating the air anticlockwise. It remains almost stationary for an prolonged period over the Bight, hence obstructing the typical easterly procession of weather systems across southern Australia.

The High can stretch thousands of kilometers across the Bight, and may move eastwards towards Tasmania towards the South Pacific Ocean. This area of high pressure is part of the great subtropical belt of anticyclones called the subtropical ridge. A cloud hole with an expansion as far as 1,000 kilometers (620 miles) has been observed, with tops of 1,040 millibars. The high may be extensive enough to interconnect with the Tasman High over in the Tasman Sea, just near New Zealand.

Effects

The anticyclonic circulation produces a dry climate, bringing warm to hot weather in the southern Australian summer. The high influences the weather and climatic patterns of vast areas of Australia; The aridity of the Australian deserts and the summer drought of southern Australia is due to the large-scale subsidence and sinking motion of air in the system. In winter, when the high remains stationary in the Bight (due to a positive SAM phase), it can block or replace cold fronts from the Bight, thereby allowing warm weather to the southeast. However, when the high remains fixed further south of the Bight within the Southern Ocean, it can drive in polar air towards the continent, whereby increasing snowfall and rain in the southeast, particularly areas that lie west of the Great Dividing Range (due to the foehn effect).

In the western part of the high, hot dry northerly winds from the dry centre push through South Australia and Victoria, ensuing heatwave conditions in these regions. Conversely, the High (when linked with a Tasman High) may direct more rainfall in southeast Australia, as feeble westerly winds result in increase of easterly onshore winds that bring moist air from the Tasman Sea towards the east coast from Brisbane to Sydney (though regions west of the Great Dividing Range would remain dry). The Australian High is one the drivers of the Southerly buster, which occurs in the southeast coast.

Locations
Cities and towns with a Mediterranean climate in southern Australia are most affected by the High during the summer; from Perth and Esperance in Western Australia to Adelaide and Mount Gambier in South Australia and Hamilton in Victoria, and as well as those with a semi-arid climate; Kalgoorlie and Eucla in Western Australia to Ceduna, Renmark and Port Pirie in South Australia. Some inland towns in New South Wales westwards of the Great Dividing Range, such as Wagga Wagga and Albury in the Riverina, and as well as those in Victoria, such as Horsham, Bendigo and Mildura, may also experience the dry effects of the High in the summer due to their more westward position and relatively close vicinity to the system.

Tasman High
Between summer and autumn, the high over southern Australia may be linked, or would intertwine, with the Tasman High in the southern Tasman Sea (between Tasmania and the South Island of New Zealand). When the high stalls in the Tasman Sea and becomes a blocking high, New Zealand and Tasmania will generally experience warm and generally dry weather, whilst the east coast of Australia (particularly southern Queensland and New South Wales) will experience moist onshore flows, including heavy rain events, and lack of warm days (though more often during a La Niña phase). 

In March 2021, and also in February and March 2022, a stubborn blocking high in the Tasman caused heavy rain and flooding over large parts of Southeast Queensland and coastal New South Wales. A blocking high in the southern Tasman Sea wards off low pressure systems and troughs out in the Tasman Sea towards eastern Australia, whereby providing rainfall on the east coast of Australia.

See also
Climate of Australia
Brickfielder

References

External links
An assessment of relationships between the Australian subtropical ridge, rainfall variability and high-latitude circulation patterns.
Influence of Global-Scale Variability on the Subtropical Ridge over Southeast Australia

Anticyclones
Climate of Australia
Regional climate effects
Southern Ocean
Indian Ocean
Tasman Sea
Great Australian Bight
Coastline of Western Australia
Coastline of South Australia
Coastline of Tasmania
Coastline of Victoria (Australia)